Kaihau Te Rangikakapi Maikara Te Whaiti (1863–1937) was a notable New Zealand tribal leader. Of Māori descent, she identified with the Ngāti Kahungunu iwi. She was born in the Wairarapa, New Zealand in 1863.

References

1863 births
1937 deaths
Ngāti Kahungunu people
People from the Wairarapa